Eskişehir Atatürk Stadium was a multi-purpose stadium in Eskişehir, Turkey.  It was used mostly for football matches and was the home ground of Eskişehirspor.  The stadium held 13,520 people and was built in 1953. It was burnt down by angry fans in 2016 following the relegation of Eskişehirspor. It was replaced in October 2016 by the New Eskişehir Stadium It was named after the Turkish statesman Mustafa Kemal Atatürk.

References

External links
Venue information

Football venues in Turkey
Eskişehirspor
Multi-purpose stadiums in Turkey
Süper Lig venues
Athletics (track and field) venues in Turkey
Buildings and structures in Eskişehir
Sports venues completed in 1953
1953 establishments in Turkey
Things named after Mustafa Kemal Atatürk